Marcel Benel (17 April 1894 – 5 May 1934) was a French racing cyclist. He rode in the 1920 Tour de France.

References

1894 births
1934 deaths
French male cyclists
Place of birth missing